Pavao Martić (Serbian: Павао Мартић; born 9 September 1940 in Split-Dalmatia County) is a Croatian rower. He competed for Yugoslavia in the 1964 European Rowing Championships in Amsterdam in the eight competition where he won a bronze medal. The same team competed two months later in the men's eight at the 1964 Summer Olympics where they came fourth. The whole team was inducted into the Slovenian Athletes Hall of Fame in 2012.

References

1940 births
Living people
Croatian male rowers
Yugoslav male rowers
Rowers at the 1964 Summer Olympics
Olympic rowers of Yugoslavia
People from Split-Dalmatia County
European Rowing Championships medalists